Nimravidae is an extinct family of carnivorans, sometimes known as false saber-toothed cats, whose fossils are found in North America and Eurasia. Not considered to belong to the true cats (family Felidae), the nimravids are generally considered closely related and classified as a distinct family in the suborder Feliformia.

The barbourofelids, which were formerly classified as a subfamily of the Nimravidae, were reassigned to their own distinct family Barbourofelidae in 2004. 
However, some recent studies suggest the barbourofelids are a branch of the nimravids, suggesting that this debate might not be settled yet.

Morphology and evolution
Most nimravids had muscular, low-slung, cat-like bodies, with shorter legs and tails than are typical of cats. Unlike extant Feliformia, the nimravids had a different bone structure in the small bones of the ear. The middle ear of true cats is housed in an external structure called an auditory bulla, which is separated by a septum into two chambers. Nimravid remains show ossified bullae with no septum, or no trace at all of the entire bulla. They are assumed to have had a cartilaginous housing of the ear mechanism. 
Nimravid feet were short, indicating they walked in a plantigrade or semiplantigrade posture, i.e., on the flat of the feet rather than the toes, like modern cats.

Although some nimravids physically resembled the saber-toothed cats, such as Smilodon, they were not closely related, but evolved a similar form through parallel evolution. They possessed synapomorphies with the barbourofelids in the cranium, mandible, dentition, and postcranium. They also had a downward-projecting flange on the front of the mandible as long as the canine teeth, a feature which also convergently evolved in the saber-toothed sparassodont Thylacosmilus.

The ancestors of nimravids and cats diverged from a common ancestor soon after the Caniformia–Feliformia split, in the middle Eocene about 50 million years ago (Mya), with a minimum constraint of 43 Mya. Recognizable nimravid fossils date from the late Eocene (37 Mya), from the Chadronian White River Formation at Flagstaff Rim, Wyoming, to the late Miocene (5 Mya). Nimravid diversity appears to have peaked about 28 Mya.

A 2021 study has shown that a sizeable amount of species developed feline-like morphologies in addition to saber-toothed taxa.

Taxonomy

The family Nimravidae was named by American paleontologist Edward Drinker Cope in 1880, with the type genus as Nimravus. The family was assigned to Fissipedia by Cope (1889); to Caniformia by Flynn and Galiano (1982); to Aeluroidea by Carroll (1988); to Feliformia by Bryant (1991); and to Carnivoramorpha, by Wesley-Hunt and Werdelin (2005).

Nimravids are placed in tribes by some authors to reflect closer relationships between genera within the family. Some nimravids evolved into large, toothed, cat-like forms with massive flattened upper canines and accompanying mandibular flanges. Some had dentition similar to felids, or modern cats, with smaller canines. Others had moderately increased canines in a more intermediate relationship between the saber-toothed cats and felids. The upper canines were not only shorter, but also more conical, than those of the true saber-toothed cats (Machairodontinae). These nimravids are referred to as "false saber-tooths".

Not only did nimravids exhibit diverse dentition, but they also showed the same diversity in size and morphology as cats. Some were leopard-sized, others the size of today's lions and tigers, one had the short face, rounded skull, and smaller canines of the modern cheetah, and one, Nanosmilus, was only the size of a small bobcat.

The Barbourofelids were for a while no longer included in Nimravidae, following elevation to family as sister clade to the true cats (family Felidae). However, several recent studies have returned them to Nimravidae, including as part of Nimravinae.

Phylogeny
The phylogenetic relationships of Nimravidae are shown in the following cladogram:

A 2021 study divides Nimravidae into Hoplophoninae and Nimravinae, the latter including the bulk of species in addition to barbourofelids.

Natural history

Nimravids appeared in the middle of the Eocene epoch, about 40 mya, in North America and Asia. The global climate at this time was warm and wet, but was trending cooler and drier toward the late Eocene. The lush forests of the Eocene were transforming to scrub and open woodland. This climatic trend continued in the Oligocene, and nimravids evidently flourished in this environment. North America and Asia were connected and shared much related fauna. Europe in the Oligocene was more of an archipelago than a continent, though some land bridges must have existed, for nimravids also spread there.

In the Miocene, the fossil record suggests that many animals suited for living in forest or woodland were replaced by grazers suited for grassland. This suggests that much of North America and Asia became dominated by savanna. Nimravids disappeared along with the woodlands, but survived in relictual humid forests in Europe to the late Miocene. When conditions ultimately changed there in the late Miocene, the last nimravids disappeared about 9 Mya.

See also 
 Oxyaenidae

References

External links 
 
 

 
Prehistoric mammal families
Bartonian first appearances
Tortonian extinctions
Taxa named by Edward Drinker Cope
Fossil taxa described in 1880